The 2022–23 season is the 57th in the history of 1. FC Magdeburg and their first season back in the second division. The club will participate in the 2. Bundesliga and the DFB-Pokal.

Players

First-team squad

Pre-season and friendlies

Competitions

Overall record

2. Bundesliga

League table

Results summary

Results by round

Matches
The league fixtures were announced on 17 June 2022.

DFB-Pokal

References

1. FC Magdeburg seasons
1. FC Magdeburg